Acrotomodes is a genus of moths in the family Geometridae. The genus was described by Warren in 1895.

Species
Acrotomodes amplificata Dognin, 1924
Acrotomodes bola Druce, 1892
Acrotomodes borumata Schaus, 1901
Acrotomodes casta Prout, 1910
Acrotomodes chiriquensis Schaus, 1901
Acrotomodes cretinotata Dognin, 1902
Acrotomodes croceata Warren, 1905
Acrotomodes erodita Debauche, 1937
Acrotomodes hemixantha Prout, 1910
Acrotomodes hepaticata Warren, 1895
Acrotomodes hielaria Schaus, 1901
Acrotomodes leprosata Warren, 1907
Acrotomodes lichenifera Warren, 1904
Acrotomodes nigripuncta Warren, 1897
Acrotomodes nigroapicata Dognin, 1924
Acrotomodes olivacea Bastelberger, 1908
Acrotomodes polla Druce, 1892
Acrotomodes puma Warren, 1895
Acrotomodes sporadata Warren, 1905
Acrotomodes unicolor Warren, 1906

References

Boarmiini
Geometridae genera